Shlomi Dahan (born 30 September 1979) is an Israeli former professional footballer who now works as a manager. Dahan is often referred to as one of Israel's greatest wastes of talent and was the subject of a documentary in Israel on why Israel has yet to produce quality footballers and the hardships they face in improving in the Israeli system of football.

Playing career
Dahan was a product of the Maccabi Netanya F.C.Maccabi Netanya youth system where he managed to catch the eye of a scout from German club Borussia Dortmund. He left Netanya for Dortmund along with Amos Sassi where the two enjoyed great success even capturing a world title in a tournament for ORT high schools.

Both Dahan and Sassi excelled at Dortmund, even taking the German youth championship while there. But in order to be able to play for Israel's full national team, they had to complete their mandatory service in the Israel Defense Forces. Both were loaned out to Maccabi Haifa where they languished on the bench. He later moved to Maccabi Netanya helping them win promotion to the first league in 1999.

In 2006 Dahan moved to Beitar Shimshon Tel Aviv and played there for 5 seasons helping the team win promotion to Liga Leumit in 2008–09. He was also a part of the shocking State Cup win against Maccabi Tel Aviv that took place on 26 February 2008.

In September 2011 he moved to Maccabi Daliyat al-Karmel from Liga Alef (North).

In November 2011 after only two months with Daliyat al-Karmel he made a move to Maccabi Ironi Kfar Yona from the bottom of Liga Alef (South).

Honours
 Israeli Second Division: 1998–99
 Liga Artzit: 2003–04
 Toto Cup Artzit: 2003–04

References

External links
 Profile and biography of Shlomi Dahan at Maccabi Haifa's official website 
 Stats at ONE 
 
 Netanya Squad at eufo.de
 

1979 births
Living people
Israeli Jews
Israeli footballers
Association football midfielders
Borussia Dortmund II players
Maccabi Haifa F.C. players
Maccabi Netanya F.C. players
Hapoel Rishon LeZion F.C. players
Hapoel Tzafririm Holon F.C. players
Hapoel Nir Ramat HaSharon F.C. players
Hapoel Afula F.C. players
Beitar Tel Aviv Bat Yam F.C. players
Maccabi Daliyat al-Karmel F.C. players
Maccabi Ironi Kfar Yona F.C. players
Israeli Premier League players
Liga Leumit players
Israeli expatriate footballers
Expatriate footballers in Germany
Israeli expatriate sportspeople in Germany